Konstantin Ivanovich Lemeshev (7 April 1907, in St. Petersburg – 21 September 1950, in Leningrad) was a Soviet Russian football player and coach. He continued coaching FC Zenit Leningrad even in declining health despite the doctors' advice and was taken to the hospital during a home game, dying a few dates later.

He was an older brother of Vladimir Lemeshev.

External links
 

1907 births
Footballers from Saint Petersburg
1950 deaths
Soviet footballers
Soviet football managers
FC Zenit Saint Petersburg managers
Association football defenders
Association football midfielders
FC Lokomotiv Saint Petersburg players